Random Acts of Violence may refer to:

 Random Acts of Violence (comics), a 2010 graphic novel
 Random Acts of Violence (film), a Canadian slasher horror film
 "Random Acts of Violence" (CSI)